Paul Collins  (born 7 December 1959 in Cork) is a former Irish rugby union international player who played for the Irish national rugby union team. He played as a flanker for the Ireland team from 1987 to 1990, winning 2 caps and was part of the Ireland squad at the 1987 Rugby World Cup where he played in one match.

References

External links
ESPN Profile

1959 births
Living people
Irish rugby union players
Ireland international rugby union players
Lansdowne Football Club players
London Irish players
Rugby union players from County Cork
Rugby union flankers